William Henry Fitzgerald (1848–1922) was a member of the Wisconsin State Assembly.

Fitzgerald was born May 15, 1848 in what is now Cedarburg, Wisconsin. Fitzgerald was originally a member during the 1878, 1879 and 1880 sessions. After the length of sessions were change to two years, he was again a member during the 1891 and 1893 sessions. Previously, Fitzgerald was Town Treasurer of Cedarburg in 1872 and Chairman (similar to Mayor) of Cedarburg in 1876 and 1877. Additionally, he was a justice of the peace. Fitzgerald was identified as an Independent Democrat and a Democrat. He married Teresa M. Dunn (1853–1933) and died on January 3, 1922, in Grafton, Wisconsin.

References

1849 births
1922 deaths
People from Cedarburg, Wisconsin
Mayors of places in Wisconsin
City and town treasurers in the United States
American justices of the peace
Wisconsin Independents
Democratic Party members of the Wisconsin State Assembly